Rasbora bunguranensis is a species of ray-finned fish in the genus Rasbora which is endemic to the Natuna Besar Island in Indonesia.

References 

Rasboras
Freshwater fish of Indonesia
Taxa named by Martin Ralph Brittan
Fish described in 1951